Kulva is a village in Jonava district municipality, in Kaunas County, in central Lithuania. According to the 2011 census, the village has a population of 378 people.

History 
Kulva was first mentioned in written sources in 1382.

In the 16th century, Kulva built its first church, constructed out of wood. It had been replaced by a brick building by 1650. Enlargement of this church was completed in 1782.

Education 
Kulva Abraomas Kulvietis primary school

Famous villagers 
Abraomas Kulvietis, jurist and a professor at Königsberg Albertina University, as well as a reformer of the church.

References

Villages in Jonava District Municipality